Rigoberto Fuentes (born on 11 February 1990), is a Nicaraguan professional football player who plays for the Nicaragua national team.

He debuted internationally on 25 March 2018 in a friendly match in a 3–3 draw against Cuba.

On 18 November 2019, Fuentes scored his first goal for Nicaragua in a 1–2 defeat against Suriname in the CONCACAF Nations League.

International goals
Scores and results list Nicaragua's goal tally first.

References

1990 births
Living people
Nicaraguan men's footballers
Nicaragua international footballers
Association football defenders